Trnovac may refer to:

 Trnovac, Novi Travnik, a village in Bosnia and Herzegovina
 Trnovac, Serbia, a village near Knjaževac, Serbia
 Trnovac, Lika-Senj County, a village near Gospić, Croatia
 Trnovac, Požega-Slavonia County, a village near Velika, Croatia
 Trnovac, North Macedonia, a village in Kratovo Municipality, North Macedonia
 Trnovac (Vrbanja), a river in Central Bosnia, Bosnia and Herzegovina, a tributary of the Vrbanja